"Bad Girl" is a song by American singer and songwriter Madonna from her fifth studio album, Erotica (1992). It was written and produced by both Madonna and Shep Pettibone, with additional writing from Anthony Shimkin. In Australia and most European countries, the song was released as the album's third single on February 2, 1993; in the United States, a release was issued on March 11, 1993. "Bad Girl" is a pop and R&B ballad with lyrics that describe a woman trying to escape her reality through self-destructive behaviors, such as drinking and chain smoking.

Upon release, "Bad Girl" received positive reviews from music critics, with some noting a departure from Madonna's highly sexual image of the time; in retrospective reviews, it is now considered one of her best and most underrated singles. Commercially, "Bad Girl" saw a lukewarm reception. In the United States, it reached number 36, becoming Madonna's first single to not reach the top 30 or top 20 of the Billboard Hot 100, breaking a streak of 27 consecutive top 20 singles that began with "Holiday" (1983) and ended with "Deeper and Deeper" (1992). "Bad Girl" fared better in the United Kingdom, where it reached the top-ten, and in Ecuador, Iceland and Italy, where it reached the charts' top-three spots.

The accompanying music video for "Bad Girl" marked Madonna's final collaboration with director David Fincher; the singer plays Louise Oriole, a successful but promiscuous Manhattan businesswoman who engages in one-night stands with multiple men, until one of them murders her. Christopher Walken played the role of her guardian angel. The music video received positive reviews, with critics deeming it one of Madonna's best, as well as noting tropes and references Fincher would go on to use in his future works. Madonna has only performed "Bad Girl" live once, during a visit to Saturday Night Live in January 1993.

Background and recording 
In 1992, Madonna founded her own multi-media entertainment company Maverick, consisting of a record company (Maverick Records), a film production company (Maverick Films), and associated music publishing, television broadcasting, book publishing, and merchandising divisions. The first two projects from the venture were her fifth studio album Erotica and a coffee table book of photographs featuring Madonna, entitled Sex. For Erotica, Madonna primarily collaborated with American producer Shep Pettibone; Pettibone first began working with the singer during the 1980s, providing remixes for several of her singles. Pettibone would build the base music of the songs in a style similar to his remixes, while Madonna wrote the melodies and lyrics. According to the producer in an article titled "Erotica Diaries", published on Madonna's Icon magazine, he created a tape of three tracks for Madonna to listen to; he traveled to Chicago, where she was filming A League of Their Own (1992), played the songs for her and she liked all of them. In October 1991, Madonna met with Pettibone in New York City to start working on demos. According to Mark Bego, the first batch of songs they worked on were "Erotica", "Deeper and Deeper", "Bad Girl", "Thief of Hearts", and "Rain". Anthony Shimkin, who also worked on the album, recalled that Madonna had with her a "book full of lyrics and melody ideas". Recording took place at Astoria's Sound Work Studios from November 1991 to October 1992. For the singer's vocals, an older style SM57 microphone was used; Pettibone believed that "sometimes, older is better".

The producer recalled how, as the recording sessions progressed, the melodies became more melancholic; he noted that Madonna's stories made the songs "a lot more serious and intense", leading them into a "deeply personal territory". Similarly, Shimkin said that "Bad Girl", along with fellow album track "In This Life", was a song that the singer had a "really deep personal attachment" to, but didn't notice this until the album was completed. He added: "['Bad Girl' is] one of those songs, like 'Oh Father' or 'Papa Don't Preach', where she really calls on her own emotions and experiences. She's never afraid to expose herself emotionally." Pettibone, however, said that he never thought of "Bad Girl" as autobiographical, but as a song people could relate to.

Composition and lyrics 

"Bad Girl" was written and produced by both Madonna and Pettibone, with additional lyrics by Anthony Shimkin. Personnel working on the song included Pettibone on the sequencing, keyboard arrangement, and programming, alongside Shimkin; Dennis Mitchell and Robin Hancock were the song's recording engineers, while Goh Hotada was in charge of mixing, and Ted Jensen of mastering.

Musicallly, "Bad Girl" is a melancholic, "somber, guilt-ridden" ballad that talks about a woman experiencing extreme sadness due to a failed relationship. Madonna's vocal range spans from F3 to C5. According to Carol Benson and Allan Metz, authors of The Madonna Companion: Two Decades of Commentary, the song highlights the main theme explored throughout Erotica of "the pain and torment of the heart and the perils of romance".

Speaking to the BBC, Madonna herself explained that the lyrics talk about a woman in a toxic relationship, trying to "distract herself from reality" through behaviors such as drinking and chain smoking; "she really cares for this person and she’s having a hard time saying goodbye [...] She’s unhappy with her situation". It begins with Madonna singing the lines "Something’s missing and I don’t know why/I always feel the need to hide my feelings from you". The "profound inner turmoil" felt by the narrator is depicted by the time the song gets to the refrain, "Bad girl, drunk by six/Kissing someone else's lips/Smoked too many cigarettes today/I’m not happy when I act this way". Billboards Larry Flick noted that Madonna's vocals are "mournful [...] amid a swirl of synths and a slow, syncopated beat".

Release and critical reception 

In Australia and numerous European countries, "Bad Girl" was released as Eroticas third official single on February 2, 1993. In the United States, it was released on March 11 with "Fever" as B-side. Upon release, "Bad Girl" was generally well received by music critics. For Billboard, Flick highlighted its "intense" lyrics which Joe Lynch, from the same magazine, considered to be Madonna's "most affecting". Benson and Metz pointed out that the song was a departure from the singer's "highly sexualized image" at the time. AllMusic's Jose F. Promis stated that the song's lukewarm commercial reception was not a reflection of its "artistic achievement". Arion Berger, from Rolling Stone, called it "riveting", and pointed out that the song sees the singer recognize the "discomfort [the audience] feel[s] when sensing the human character of a woman whose function is purely sexual. A sex symbol herself, she coolly removes the threat of her own personality." J. D. Considine, for The Baltimore Sun, named it "as sobering as it is sad", and opined, "Simply hearing the quaver in her voice as she insists 'You'll always be my baby' is enough to break any listener's heart." Chris Willman, for Los Angeles Times, named it one of Eroticas best tracks, as it "trades in mixed emotions instead of purely catty or cornball ones". Slant Magazines Sal Cinquemani deemed it a hymn to promiscuity, and Anthony Violanti, from The Buffalo News, Madonna's "personal confessional on love". A negative review came from Entertainment Weeklys David Browne, who dismissed it as a "lonely-at-the-top, lovesick-victim" song. Graham Gremore, writing for Queerty, was also dismissive of the track, referring to it as "sappy" and opining that "Thief of Hearts", another song from Erotica, would've made a better single.

Retrospective reviews have been positive. Eric Henderson, for Slant Magazine, named the song Madonna's 35th greatest single and a "brutal self-laceration served in the most flamboyantly melodramatic fashion imaginable"; Henderson also compared it to "In This Life", with the exception that "['Bad Girl'] is the far more dangerous track". For Albumism's Justin Chadwick, it is the single that "leaves the most enduring impression" and reinforces Madonna's abilities to craft "ballads that carry emotional weight without coming across as overwrought". Matthew Jacobs from HuffPost said the track is the "classiest" in Erotica, and placed it at number 34 of his ranking of the singer's singles. A similar opinion was shared by The Backlot's Louis Virtel, who felt the track is a "classy ballad with a great message", and the singer's 75th best song. On Gay Star News ranking, "Bad Girl" came in at number 27. The song was considered a "well-honed, slow piece of pop theatre" by The Guardians Jude Rogers, who also deemed it Madonna's 45th best. "Bad Girl" was classified as the singer's 42nd and 49th greatest song by Rolling Stone and Entertainment Weeklys Chuck Arnold, respectively; the latter opined it "feels like a great deep cut rather than a single". 

It has also been considered one of Madonna's most underrated tracks: Idolators Mike Wass said that, thematically, it "deserved to be recognized as one of [Madonna]'s signature songs"; in another occasion, Wass opined that the song "should have been bigger" as it is "one of the most achingly-honest pop songs of the '90s", as well as a "towering achievement that still holds up today". From the Official Charts Company, Justin Myers considered "Bad Girl" to be one of Madonna's "hidden gems" that show off her "storytelling abilities in its (rather depressing) lyrics". Lisa Yang from WatchMojo also placed it among Madonna's most underrated songs, adding that, "with its intentionally vintage sound, 'Bad Girl' was a refreshing look at the reality of Madonna's party-focused lyrics". In 2022, the staff of Queerty referred to "Bad Girl" as one of the singer's "most underappreciated" singles. Matthew Barton, writing for British magazine The Quietus, said it was among "the most gorgeous ballads of [Madonna's] career".

Chart performance 
In the United States, "Bad Girl" debuted on the Billboard Hot 100 at number 75, in the issue dated February 20, 1993. As the weeks went by, the song climbed places and finally peaked at number 36 on the week of March 27. "Bad Girl" became Madonna's first single to not reach the top 30 or top 20 of the Hot 100, breaking a streak of 27 consecutive top 20 singles that began with "Holiday" (1983) and ended with "Deeper and Deeper", as well as her lowest-charting song since "Oh Father" (1989). Fred Bronson attributed the single's poor chart performance to the controversy surrounding Madonna with Erotica, the Sex book, and the film Body of Evidence (1993). Similarly, Promis felt that the public was tired of the artist's "bratty bad girl posturing", which was in "full swing" at the time of the single's release. On the Hot 100 component charts Top 40 Radio Monitor and Top Singles Sales, it reached numbers 44 and 36, respectively. "Bad Girl" peaked at number 26 on the Mainstream Top 40 chart. The "Fever"/"Bad Girl" release reached the first position of Billboards Dance Singles Sales chart, and came in at number 46 on the year-end chart. In Canada, the single peaked at number 20 of RPMs Top Singles chart on the week of March 27, 1993.

In the United Kingdom, "Bad Girl" debuted at number 11 on the UK Singles Chart and peaked at number 10 on March 13, 1993; it was present on the chart for a total of seven weeks. According to Music Week magazine, over 74,915 copies of the single have been sold in the UK as of 2008. In other European countries, such as France, Germany, and Belgium, the single saw a weak commercial reception as it failed to crack the top 30. The song fared better in the charts of Switzerland and Ireland, peaking at 25 and 20, respectively. In Australia, "Bad Girl" entered the ARIA Singles Chart at number 40, eventually peaking at 32 and lasting seven weeks on the chart. In countries like Italy, Iceland, and Ecuador, the song reached the top 3 of the charts.

Music video

Background and synopsis 

The "Bad Girl" music video was filmed on location in New York in January 1993, under the direction of David Fincher, who had previously worked with Madonna on "Express Yourself" (1989), "Oh Father", and "Vogue" (1990). The singer had previously asked Tim Burton to direct the video, but he turned the offer down; Mark Romanek, who would go on to direct the videos for "Rain" and "Bedtime Story" (1995), was also approached. Personnel working on the clip included Bob Jenkins in editing, Juan Ruiz Anchía in cinematography, and Jeffrey Beecroft as production designer. The plot was inspired by Richard Brooks Looking for Mr. Goodbar (1977) and Wim Wenders Wings of Desire (1987). In the video, Madonna plays Louise Oriole, a "promiscuous, chainsmoking Manhattan career woman"; Louise is the singer's middle name, while Oriole likely references Oriole Way, a Los Angeles street in which she lived with her ex-husband Sean Penn. Actor Christopher Walken played the role of the singer's guardian angel. Walken recalled his participation as being "kind of fun." Actors Mark Margolis, Tomas Arana, James Rebhorn, Rob Campbell, and Matt Dillon also appeared on the music video; Dillon plays a police detective, but was uncredited.

The video begins with the police finding Madonna's dead body. Louise Oriole is a successful, chain smoking alcoholic businesswoman, who engages in one-night stands with multiple men. She behaves this way in order to try and deal with the depression and sadness over a failed relationship; all throughout the video, her guardian angel watches over her. In one scene, Louise wakes up alone in her bed after a one-night stand and discovers a hand-written note laying on the pillow beside her. She gets upset after reading its content and tosses the note to the ground; her angel picks it up, revealing its content: "Thank you, whoever you are", the paper reads. Towards the end of the video, Louise picks up another stranger. All of a sudden, the song stops, a cat hisses, a can of breath freshener is sprayed, and the angel kisses her on the lips. It is then implied that the man murdered Louise with her stockings; after her death, she reappears as a spirit along with her guardian angel, overseeing the police taking her body away to the morgue. The final shot shows Louise and her angel being lifted away on a director's chair.

Reception and analysis 

The music video was positively received by critics. Georges-Claude Guilbert considered it a "masterpiece of the genre". The Odyssey's Rocco Papa named the visual Madonna's "most cinematic", as it "features a plot in a way videos rarely do today". He ranked the video her fifth best. Louis Virtel from The Backlot placed it at number 21 of his ranking of the singer's videos; "beautifully shot, dramatically acted [...] unexpectedly emotional". Parades Samuel Murrian highlighted the performances: "[Madonna] can be such a brilliant actor, and her performance as a broken, unhappy woman whose self-destructive behavior gets her killed is one of her best." He also noted that the "sad [and] disturbing" clip "lingers in the memory long after you’ve seen it—like all of [Fincher's] best work"; he considered it Madonna's 16th greatest music video. The Independents Adam White also praised the singer's performance and the directing, writing that "[Fincher directs] her to express all kinds of contradictory emotions through mere glances or expressions. It is a remarkable performance full of self-loathing, withdrawal and, finally, child-like bliss". "Bad Girl" was considered one of Madonna's most underrated music videos by both VH1's Christopher Rosa and Idolators Mike Neid; the latter one called it her most "over-the-top". "Bad Girl" came in the ninth position of a poll conducted by Billboard of the singer's 10 greatest videos. For Sal Cinquemani, it's Madonna's 18th greatest music video. White said it was Fincher's "most important venture", noting a "short, stylish erotic thriller" that nods toward the work the filmmaker would go on to do in the future. He furthered compared it to Madonna and Fincher's collaboration in 1989's "Oh Father", as both videos feel like "personal exorcism for [Madonna]" that only Fincher could capture. White concluded by referring to "Bad Girl" as an "unexpected final chapter in the Madonna/Fincher saga [...] something of a twisted funeral for their love story – emotive and affectionate, yet filled with bloody murder".

David Denby deemed the music video a "premature summation of Fincher's work in miniature", pointing out references to other works by the director: the police discovering Madonna's corpse referenced Seven (1995); the "backward-running timepiece" image of Walken's angel of death character looking at his watch became the "key visual and metaphysical idea" in The Curious Case of Benjamin Button (2008). Finally, Madonna being murdered by a seeming serial killer was a reference to both Seven and Zodiac (2007). In a similar note, Vices Raza Syed wrote that the music video "has many of the hallmarks of David Fincher's style of cinematography that would dominate much of his subsequent filmography: air-tight camerawork, brushed-metal visual palette, corporate intrigue, a palpable sense of emotional isolation... and murder". White compared the Louise Oriole character to Amy Elliott Dunne from Gone Girl (2014), as both women share a "troubled antihero quality". According to Mark Browning, the shot of Walken and the singer in an elevated director's chair signifies a "God-like" presence in the actor's character; the author also felt this particular shot was an intentional, tongue-in-cheek reference by Fincher to "the responsibility and pressure that comes with directing". In Experiencing Music Video: Aesthetics and Cultural Context (2004), Carol Vernallis pointed out that, through "iconic imagery", the viewer can predict the fate of Madonna's character: her black dress in a dry cleaner's plastic bag alludes the body bag she will be wrapped in; the cat hissing at her suggest she's already a "ghost or figure who bears a curse"; finally, a door Madonna walks through looks like the "entrance to Hades". The music video can be found on Madonna's 1999 compilation The Video Collection 93:99.

Live performance and cover versions 

The only live performance of "Bad Girl" took place on January 16, 1993, on the late-night live television show Saturday Night Live. After finishing the song, Madonna tore up a photograph of Joey Buttafuoco – the alleged lover of Amy Fisher, the Long Island teenager who shot Buttafuoco's wife Mary Jo – and yelled, "Fight the real enemy!" This echoed Sinéad O'Connor, who ripped apart a photograph of Pope John Paul II and yelled the same thing when she was the show's musical guest in October 1992. HuffPost considered this one of Madonna's "most legendary" performances, and Myers said it had one of her "very best live vocals".

A cover by Boy George, Amanda Ghost, and James Hardway, was included on the tribute albums Virgin Voices: A Tribute to Madonna, Vol. 1 (1999), A Tribute to Madonna: Virgin Voices (2003), Tribute to Madonna: Like a Virgin (2005), and The World's Greatest 80's Tribute to Madonna (2006). A rendition by Semi Moore was included on 2000's Truly Blue: Tribute to Madonna. Covers by Cruzer and Strike a Pose were included Immaculate Deception: A Tribute to the Music of Madonna (2004) and A Tribute To Madonna Vol 1 (2006), respectively.

Track listings and formats 

 US 7-inch vinyl and cassette single; Japanese 3-inch CD single
 "Bad Girl" (edit) – 4:38
 "Fever" – 5:00

 US 12-inch maxi-single
 "Bad Girl" (extended mix) – 6:29
 "Fever" (extended 12-inch mix) – 6:08
 "Fever" (Shep's Remedy Dub) – 4:29
 "Fever" (Murk Boys Miami Mix) – 7:10
 "Fever" (Murk Boys Deep South Mix) – 6:28
 "Fever" (Oscar G's Dope Mix) – 4:55

 US and Australian CD maxi-single
 "Bad Girl" (edit) – 4:38
 "Fever" (Murk Boys Miami Mix) – 7:10
 "Fever" (extended 12-inch mix) – 6:08
 "Bad Girl" (extended mix) – 6:29
 "Fever" (Murk Boys Deep South Mix) – 6:28
 "Fever" (Hot Sweat 12-inch mix) – 7:55

Digital single – "Bad Girl / Fever"
 "Bad Girl" (edit) – 4:35
 "Bad Girl" (extended mix) – 6:29
 "Fever" (album edit) – 4:30
 "Fever" (edit one) – 4:05
 "Fever" (extended 12-inch mix) – 6:07
 "Fever" (Hot Sweat 12-inch mix) – 7:58
 "Fever" (Murk Boys Deep South Mix) – 6:28
 "Fever" (Murk Boys Miami Mix) – 7:10
 "Fever" (Murk Boys Miami Dub) – 7:12
 "Fever" (radio edit/remix) – 5:09
 "Fever" (Shep's Remedy Dub) – 4:31
 "Fever" (Oscar G's Dope Mix) – 4:55

Credits and personnel 
Credits are adapted from the album's liner notes.
 Madonna – lead vocals, songwriter, producer
 Shep Pettibone – songwriter, producer, sequencing, keyboard, programming
 Joe Moskowitz – keyboards
 P. Dennis Mitchell – recording engineer
 Robin Hancock – recording engineer
 Goh Hotoda – mixing engineer
 Ted Jensen – mastering

Charts

Weekly charts

Year-end charts

References

Bibliography 
 
 
 
 
 
 
 
 
 

1990s ballads
1992 songs
1993 singles
American contemporary R&B songs
Angels in art
Contemporary R&B ballads
Madonna songs
Maverick Records singles
Music videos directed by David Fincher
Pop ballads
Sire Records singles
Song recordings produced by Madonna
Song recordings produced by Shep Pettibone
Songs about alcohol
Songs about casual sex
Songs written by Madonna
Songs written by Shep Pettibone
Warner Records singles